Gunnar Valfrid Jarring (12 October 1907 – 29 May 2002) was a Swedish diplomat and Turkologist.

Early life
Jarring was born in Brunnby, Malmöhus County, Sweden, the son of Gottfrid Jönsson, a farmer, and his wife Betty (née Svensson). He had four siblings. Jarring earned a Bachelor of Arts degree from Lund University in 1928, a Licentiate Degree in 1931, and a Doctor of Philosophy degree in 1933 with his dissertation Studien zu einer osttürkischen Lautlehre ("Studies in Eastern Turkic Phonology"). The same year he was appointed docent in Turkish linguistics at Lund University. Jarring also served as curator of Helsingborgs-Landskrona Student Nation at Lund University in 1933. He taught Turkic languages at the university for the rest of the 1930s. Jarring was also a board member of the Svenska orientsällskapet ("Swedish Oriental Society") from 1936 to 1940 and of the Centralbyrån i Lund för populära vetenskapliga föreläsningar ("The Central Office in Lund for Popular Scientific Lectures") at Lund University from 1939 to 1941. He conducted study trips to, among others, Chinese Turkestan 1929–1930, to Moscow and Leningrad in 1934, to the Northwest India and Afghanistan 1935–1936, and to the Near East in 1940.

Diplomatic career

Jarring entered the Swedish diplomatic service and worked for the Swedish foreign service as attaché at their embassy in Ankara in 1940. He was head of Department B at the Swedish legation in Tehran in 1941 and acting chargé d'affaires in Tehran and Baghdad in 1945. Jarring served as acting first legation secretary in 1945 and acting legation counselor and acting chargé d'affaires in Addis Abeba in 1946. Jarring was then Swedish envoy to India in 1948 and to Ceylon in 1950 as well as to Iran, Iraq and Pakistan in 1951. He served as Director (Utrikesråd) and head of the Political Department at the Ministry for Foreign Affairs in Stockholm from 1952 to 1956 and as an expert in the United Nations General Assembly in 1955.

After several other diplomatic missions, he was Sweden's Permanent Representative to the United Nations from 1956 to 1958, and sat in the Security Council for the last two of those years. He was ambassador to the United States from 1958 to 1964, and to the Soviet Union from 1964 to 1973, as well as Mongolia from 1965 to 1973. In that capacity he signed on behalf of his country on the Outer Space Treaty in January 1967.

After the 1967 Six-Day War and the adoption of UN Security Council Resolution 242, Jarring was appointed by the UN Secretary-General U Thant as a Special Representative of the Secretary-General for the Middle East peace process, the so-called Jarring Mission, during which he worked with the Four Powers who included United States UN Permanent Representative Ambassador Charles W. Yost. Jarring's methods of negotiation were used unsuccessfully until the 1973 Yom Kippur War. The mission officially lasted until 1991. The role of mediator in the Middle East conflict made Jarring decide not to give any interviews or comments, giving him the famous nickname "The Clam", sometimes even "The Super Clam".

Gunnar Jarring continued to publish studies on Eastern Turkic languages throughout his diplomatic career and after retirement. He is one of the few people to ever be mentioned by name in a United Nations Security Council Resolution, appearing in Resolution 331. His mention has also been made in the UN Security Councils's Resolution 123 dated 21 February 1957 on the issue of Jammu & Kashmir.

Personal life
In 1932, he married Agnes Charlier (born 1909), the daughter of professor Carl Charlier and Siri Dorotea (née Leissner). He was the father of Eva (born 1949).

List of Publications

Selected books

Selected articles
 Gunnar Jarring. Obituary: Nikolaj Aleksandrovic Baskakov. Turkic Languages 1, 1997.
 Gunnar Jarring. The toponym Takla-makan. Turkic Languages 1, 1997.

Awards and decorations
   Commander Grand Cross of the Order of the Polar Star (6 June 1972)
   Grand Cross of the Order of Menelik II
   Grand Cross 2nd Class of the Order of Merit of the Federal Republic of Germany
   Commander 1st Class of the Order of the Dannebrog
   Grand Knight's Cross with Star of the Order of the Falcon (22 April 1954)
   Commander with Star of the Order of St. Olav (1 July 1953)
   Commander of the Order of Civil Merit
   Commander of the Order of Homayoun
   Officer of the Order of the German Eagle
   Officer of the Order of Merit of the Republic of Hungary
   4th Class of the Order of the Cross of Liberty with swords

Honours
Member of the Royal Swedish Academy of Sciences (1937)
Member of the Royal Society of the Humanities at Lund (Kungliga Humanistiska Vetenskapssamfundet i Lund) (1965)
Member of the Royal Swedish Academy of Letters, History and Antiquities (1968)
Member of the Royal Swedish Academy of War Sciences (1970)
Member of the Royal Physiographic Society in Lund (1972)
Member of the Royal Society for Publication of Manuscripts on Scandinavian History (Kungliga Samfundet för utgivande av handskrifter rörande Skandinaviens historia) (1974)
Member of the Turkish Language Association (1957, honorary member 1978)
Honorary member of the Royal Asiatic Society of Great Britain and Ireland (1970)
Member of the Finnish Academy of Science and Letters (1981)
Corresponding member of the Finno-Ugrian Society (1976)
Corresponding member of the Bavarian Academy of Sciences and Humanities (1981)
Honorary member of the American Oriental Society (1983)
Honorary member of the Societas Uralo-Altaica (1985)
Title of Professor (Professors namn) (1986)

References

Further reading

The Jarring Mission - A Study of the UN Peace Effort in the Middle East, 1967-1971 Hulda Kjeang Mørk, University of Oslo, 2007.

External links
 The Jarring Collection – Manuscripts from Eastern Turkestan
A 1969 satirical depiction of Gunnar Jarring's mediation efforts, by Israeli playwright Hanoch Levin 

1907 births
2002 deaths
People from Höganäs Municipality
Lund University alumni
Academic staff of Lund University
Linguists of Turkic languages
Explorers of Central Asia
Permanent Representatives of Sweden to the United Nations
Swedish orientalists
Ambassadors of Sweden to India
Ambassadors of Sweden to Sri Lanka
Ambassadors of Sweden to Iran
Ambassadors of Sweden to Iraq
Ambassadors of Sweden to Pakistan
Ambassadors of Sweden to the United States
Ambassadors of Sweden to the Soviet Union
Ambassadors of Sweden to Mongolia
People of the C-byrån
Swedish officials of the United Nations
Commanders Grand Cross of the Order of the Polar Star
Grand Crosses with Star and Sash of the Order of Merit of the Federal Republic of Germany
Members of the Royal Swedish Academy of Sciences
Members of the Royal Swedish Academy of Letters, History and Antiquities
Members of the Royal Swedish Academy of War Sciences
Members of the Royal Physiographic Society in Lund
Fellows of the Royal Asiatic Society
Members of the Finnish Academy of Science and Letters
Members of the Bavarian Academy of Sciences
Recipients of orders, decorations, and medals of Ethiopia